The Mechanical Bull Tour was the third headlining tour by American rock band Kings of Leon. The tour was in support of their sixth studio album, Mechanical Bull (2013) and began on February 5, 2014, in Atlanta, and ended on March 15, 2015, in Santiago.

Background
The tour was first announced in October 2013.
In November 2013, while in Australia, Caleb Followill confirmed to triple j's Veronica and Lewis that the band would be returning there in 2014 for the tour. 
 In December 2013, dates for the second North America leg were announced. The third North America leg was announced on April 21, 2014 Due to an injury to Nathan Followill, eleven shows in August were canceled.

Opening acts
Baba Shrimp 
Gary Clark, Jr. 
Haim 
Kongos 
The Last Internationale 
Local Natives 
searching Alaska
Twin Atlantic 
White Lies 
Young the Giant

Setlist

"Charmer"
"Rock City"
"My Party"
"Temple"
"On Call"
"Family Tree"
"Closer"
"The Immortals"
"Back Down South"
"Wait for Me"
"Supersoaker"
"Milk"
"Pyro"
"Tonight"
"Radioactive"
"The Bucket"
"Don't Matter"
"Molly's Chambers"
"Four Kicks"
"Be Somebody"
"Notion"
"Cold Desert"
"Use Somebody"
Encore
"Crawl"
"Black Thumbnail"
"Sex on Fire"

Tour dates

Canceled shows
8/10: Saratoga Springs, New York
8/13: Wantagh, New York
8/15: Bristow, Virginia
8/16: Bethel, New York
8/19: Darien, New York
8/20: Cuyahoga Falls, Ohio
8/22: Cincinnati, Ohio
8/23: Noblesville, Indiana
8/26: Gilford, New Hampshire
8/28: Holmdel, New Jersey
8/29: Burgettstown, Pennsylvania

Box office score data

Tour bus accident
On August 9, 2014, drummer Nathan Followill was injured in a tour bus accident. On their way to their hotel after their show in Mansfield, "a pedestrian jumped in front of their bus, causing the bus to stop short." Followill suffered from broken ribs. Due to the injury the band had to cancel eleven shows from August 10–31.

References

External links

2014 concert tours
2015 concert tours